Uriah M. Rose, or Uriah Milton Rose, is a marble sculpture depicting the American lawyer of the same name by Frederick Ruckstull, installed in the United States Capitol's National Statuary Hall, in Washington, D.C., as part of the National Statuary Hall Collection. The statue was gifted by the U.S. state of Arkansas in 1917.

In 2019, the Arkansas Legislature decided to replace the statue with another.

References

External links

 

1917 establishments in Washington, D.C.
Marble sculptures in Washington, D.C.
Confederate States of America monuments and memorials in Washington, D.C.
Rose, Uriah
Sculptures of men in Washington, D.C.